The Assembly of Representatives is the lower house of the bicameral Supreme Assembly of Tajikistan. The People's Democratic Party of Tajikistan has been the dominant party in the legislature since 2000.

Electoral system
Members of the Assembly of Representatives are elected by two methods; 41 members are elected in single-member constituencies using the two-round system, whilst 22 are elected by proportional representation in a single nationwide constituency, with an electoral threshold of 5%.

Chairmen of Majlisi namoyandagon

2020 Parliamentary election
Results of the 2020 election

References

External links
 

Tajikistan
Government of Tajikistan
Tajikistan
1999 establishments in Tajikistan